A jacket is a garment for the upper body. The word may also mean:

Coverings
 Bullet jacket, the plating/covering of a bullet's core with metal to give it a higher velocity
 Dust jacket, the detachable outer cover of a book

Arts and entertainment
 Jacket (magazine), an online poetry magazine
 The Jacket (2005), an American film directed by John Maybury
 "The Jacket" (Seinfeld), a television episode
 The Jacket (novel) or The Star Rover, a 1915 novel by Jack London
 The Jacket (book), a 2001 children's book by Andrew Clements
 The main character in Hotline Miami and a supporting character in Hotline Miami 2: Wrong Number

People
 Barbara Jacket (born 1934), American retired track and field coach
 Ileana Jacket (born 1947), German-born Venezuelan actress

Other uses
 Jacket, Missouri, United States, an unincorporated community
 Jacket (software), the GPU engine for MATLAB
 The supporting legs and lattice framework of an offshore fixed steel oil platform or wind turbine
 Berkeley High Jacket, the student newspaper of Berkeley High School, California

See also
 Jacket matrix, a square matrix that is a generalization of the Hadamard matrix
 Jacket potato, a baked potato filled with other ingredients
 
 Greenjackets (disambiguation)
 Red Jacket (disambiguation)
 Yellowjacket (disambiguation)